Le Soléal is a cruise ship operated by Compagnie du Ponant.

History
The ship was built at the Fincantieri shipyard in Ancona, Italy, and was launched on the 6 December 2012, being christened by Kiki Tauck Mahar.
The vessel started its maiden voyage on 1 July 2013.

Le Soléal became the first French commercial shipping vessel to traverse the Northwest Passage. The vessel left Kangerlussuaq in Greenland on August 26, 2013 and arrived in Anadyr, in Russia on September 16, 2013.

References

External links

External links

 Compagnie du Ponant official site page about the ship

Ships built in Ancona
Ships built by Fincantieri
Ships of Compagnie du Ponant
2012 ships